Hna Yauk Ta Eain Met is a 2000 Burmese drama film, directed by Naung Htun Lwin and Nyi Nyi Htun Lwin starring Dwe, Htet Htet Moe Oo and Kyi Lae Lae Oo.

Cast
Dwe as Myint Mo
Htet Htet Moe Oo as Wutt Hmone
Min Khit as Aung Latt
Wyne as Aung Myo Zin
Kyi Lae Lae Oo as Mi Mi Zin
Moe Pwint as Moe Pwint
A Yine as Khin Maung Naung
Kyaw Htoo as Kyaw Htoo
Ayeyar as Ayeyar
Chit Sayar as Chit Sayar
Myint Naing as U Myint Naing
Saw Naing as U Maung Maung Soe
Jolly Swe as Ba Gyi Nyunt

References

2000 films
2000s Burmese-language films
Burmese drama films
Films shot in Myanmar
2000 drama films